Abhaya Ranasinghe Arachchilage Chandana Weerakumara;, known as Sakvithi Ranasighe is a popular English teacher in Sri Lanka.

Early life
Weerakumara was the youngest of the 5 children of single mother H.T.D Chandra Latha. He took his primary education at D. S. Senanayake College Colombo 7. Being the only child who was successful in education, Weerakumara started conducting English Language tuition in Rathmalana under the alias "Sakvith Ranasighe". Within a short period of time, he became a famous English tutor in the island with the use of aggressive advertising campaigns and paid television programs. He used the controversial slogan "Mama iganweematama Upannemi" meaning "I was born to teach".

Financial Scams
As a result of the fame and financial success gained from his teaching, in the year 2003, Sakvithi Ranasighe started a company called "S. R. Property Sharing Investment (Private) Limited" which claimed of giving attractive dividends for its depositors. Subsequently, Ranasinghe started another company called "Sakvithi Constructions" which was supposedly engaged in buying and selling of properties. Later, it was revealed that he was engaged in selling lands by making counterfeit land deeds.
Based on numerous complains from the victims, on September 26, 2008, Sakvithi scam was busted by Central Bank following further investigations. On the same month, the Police has announced that Sakvithi Ranasinghe has fled the country to Chennai, India. Later, it was estimated that total of Rs.1,060 million belonging to 2,135 depositors was missing along with him.

Arrest
In August 2010, Ranasinghe and his wife were arrested by Mirihana Police when he was disguised in Nawagamuwa. Criminal Investigation Department of Sri Lanka was carrying out the investigation and he was remanded by a Court ruling
of Nugegoda Magistrate. Further investigations revealed that most of the money he swindled were spent while gambling in casinos  such as MGM, Bellagio and Baylies regularly with his associates.

Sentence
While trial for fraud is being carried out, on 30 January 2013 Ranasinghe pleaded guilty to bigamy. According to the case filed by the Sri Lanka Attorney General, Ranasinghe had married his first wife Subashini de Silva on 9 March 1998. At the same time he had married for the second time, Anuruddhika Kumari, and had two children by her. He was sentenced for two years rigorous imprisonment by the Colombo High Court.  

In September of 2022, Sakvithi Ranasinghe, who pleaded guilty to financial fraud, was sentenced to 22 years rigorous imprisonment suspended for 5 years by the Colombo High Court. The accused who pleaded guilty to 11 charges was sentenced two years for each charge. The Magistrate also imposed a fine of Rs. 275,000 on the accused. Meanwhile, the wife of Sakvithi Ranasinghe, who pleaded guilty to one charge was also sentenced to two years imprisonment suspended for five years and subjected to a fine of Rs. 25,000.

References

Year of birth missing (living people)
Living people
Sinhalese businesspeople
Sri Lankan criminals
Sri Lankan Buddhists
Sri Lankan fraudsters